is a Japanese footballer.

Career
He started his career in Singapore. Since 2020 he has played in Albirex Niigata (S).

In 2022 he moved to Lithuanian DFK Dainava. He made his debut in First League at 20 March 2022 against Be1 NFA. First time he scored on 26 March 2022 against FK Garliava. On 6 May 2022 he scored a goal in LFF Cup game against FK Šturmas.

Career statistics

Club

Notes

References

1999 births
Living people
Association football people from Aichi Prefecture
Japanese footballers
Japanese expatriate footballers
Association football defenders
Singapore Premier League players
I Lyga players
Japan Soccer College players
Albirex Niigata Singapore FC players
FK Dainava Alytus players
Japanese expatriate sportspeople in Singapore
Expatriate footballers in Singapore